The 25th Luna Awards were held on December 27, 2007 at Club Filipino and they honored the best Filipino films of the year 2006. It was delayed due to lack of government funding.

The nominees were announced on November 29, 2007. Kasal, Kasali, Kasalo received the most nominations with eight. Inang Yaya followed with six.

The winners were announced before the awards night. Kasal, Kasali, Kasalo gained most of the awards with six awards, including Best Picture.

Winners and nominees

Special awards

Multiple nominations and awards

References

External links
 Official Website of the Film Academy of the Philippines

Luna Awards
2006 film awards
2007 in Philippine cinema